The Breed may refer to:

 The Breed (2001 film), a vampire horror film directed by Michael Oblowitz
 The Breed (2006 film), a killer dog horror film directed by Nicholas Mastandrea
 The Breed, a rap artist from the UK

See also:

 Breed